Martis is a comune (municipality) in the Province of Sassari in the Italian region Sardinia.

Martis may also refer to:

People
 Eternity Martis (born 1993), Canadian author
 John Martis (born 1940), Scottish former professional footballer
 Liandro Martis (born 1995), Curaçaoan professional footballer who as a striker
 Nikolaos Martis  (1915–2013), Greek author and politician
 Shairon Martis (born 1987), Dutch-Curaçaoan professional baseball pitcher
 Shelton Martis (born 1982), Curaçaoan footballer who plays as a defender
 Stefan Martis, fourth-highest scoring fighter ace from Slovakia during World War II

Other
 Martis people, now extinct Native American group
 Martis Valley, Martis Creek, Martis Lake, etc., a geographic feature in the western United States